Dynamism of a speeding Horse + Houses is a sculpture from Umberto Boccioni realized in 1914-1915.

It is now part of the Peggy Guggenheim Collection art museum in Venice.

Description
With this artwork Boccioni aims at representing his idea on the concept of space, according to which not being able to see the distance means not to be able to perceive it. As a consequence, a spinning horse and some houses in the background look to the observer as single dynamic unity.

Umberto Boccioni sculpted Dynamism of a speeding Horse + Houses after publishing his manifesto on futurist sculpture technical rules. In this document the artist encourages the use of several and different materials, the idea of an interpenetration among subject and background and the refuse of closed forms.

See also

Sculptures by Umberto Boccioni
Futurist sculpture
1915 sculptures
Peggy Guggenheim Collection
Horses in art